Shireen Sungkar (born January 28, 1992) is an Indonesian actress and singer of Arabic and Minangkabau descent. She is the daughter of Indonesian actors Fanny Bauty and Mark Sungkar.

Career 
Shireen started out as a semi-finalist on GADIS sampul pageant, 2006. Liking acting since childhood, Shireen was cast for her first role while delivering her aunt in SinemArt casting. Her first role was a supporting role in a soap opera Bukan diriku along with Baim Wong and Ririn Dwi Ariyanti. Her name began to be known since starred in the soap opera, Wulan along with Dhini Aminarti. Another patron who had also been supported like, Putri Duyung and Perempuan Teraniaya.

Apart from SinemArt, Shireen moved to MD Entertainment and immediately got the lead role as Fitri in "Cinta Fitri 1 & 2" .

Not just acting, Shireen also have talents in singing field. Together with her older sister, Zaskia Sungkar, she formed the vocal duo group The Sisters. Debut album of the two was given the title The Journey of Love was released on July 25, 2008.

Personal life 
As an act of gratitude for her success in the play as Fitri, Shireen performed Umrah worship to celebrate Idul Fitri 1428 H in the holy land of Mecca. Shireen went with her parents, Mark Sungkar and Fanny Bauty, also Zaskia, 21, her sister, and Yusuf, 12, her brother. They departed from October 6 and returned to Jakarta on Tuesday, October 16, 2007.

She married Teuku Wisnu on November 17, 2013.

Filmography

Film

Television

Music video 
 Dik - (Wali) (2008)
 Egokah Aku - (Wali) (2008)
 Aku Sakit - (Wali) (2008)

Discography 
 Kamu Kamu Lagi
 Jauh Di Mata Dekat Di Hati
 Keajaiban Cinta
 Ku Sedang Jatuh Cinta
 Tak Lagi Sama
 Cinta Kita (with Teuku Wisnu)
 Allahu Akbar (with Teuku Wisnu)
 Anything For You (with Teuku Wisnu)
 Penjaga Hati

Awards and nominations

References

External links 
 
 Shiren Sungkar Biography
 Cinta Fitri Tamat, Shireen Sungkar Bersyukur

1992 births
Minangkabau people
21st-century Indonesian women singers
Indonesian pop singers
Indonesian soul singers
Living people
People from Jakarta
Indonesian Muslims